The Counts of Gorizia, also known as the Meinhardiner, were a comital, princely and ducal dynasty in the Holy Roman Empire. Named after Gorizia Castle in Gorizia (now in Italy, on the border with Slovenia), they were originally "advocates" (Vogts) in the Patriarchate of Aquileia who ruled the County of Gorizia (Görz) from the early 12th century until the year 1500. Staunch supporters of the Emperors against the papacy, they reached the height of their power in the aftermath of the battle of Marchfeld between the 1280s and 1310s, when they controlled most of contemporary Slovenia, western and south-western Austria and north-eastern Italy mostly as (princely) Counts of Gorizia and Tyrol, Landgraves of Savinja and Dukes of Carinthia and Carniola. After 1335, they began a steady decline until their territories shrunk back to the original County of Gorizia by the mid 1370s. Their remaining lands were inherited by the Habsburg ruler Maximilian I.

Overview 
The Meinhardiner where mentioned as Count of Gorizia in 1117. From 1253, the dynasty ruled the County of Tyrol. In 1271, their vast possessions were split. The main branch kept the recently acquired Tyrol and became known as Counts of Gorizia-Tyrol or the Meinhardiner Line after Meinhard, Duke of Carinthia. The cadet branch, known as the Albertine Line, after Meinhard's younger brother Albert, took over the original possessions in the County of Gorizia, the Puster Valley, as well as the title of palatine counts in Carinthia (together with the domains in the upper Drava Valley).

Both branches participated in the coalition against the Premyslid king Ottokar II of Bohemia on the side of king Rudolf I of Germany and were awarded vast estates after the former's defeat in the Battle of Marchfeld. In 1286, the Gorizia-Tyrol line became Dukes of Carinthia and landraves of Carniola, and took over de facto rule in Savinja, while the Albertine branch was granted most of the Windic March and the County of Metlika. In 1306 and again from 1307 to 1310, Henry of Gorizia-Tyrol ruled as King of Bohemia and hold the titular title of King of Poland, due to his marriage with the Přemyslid heiress Anne. However, as Henry left no male heirs, the Gorizia-Tyrol branch became extinct upon the death of his daughter Margaret in 1369. Their lands were inherited by the Habsburgs.

The Albertine line maintained the rule in the comital lands around Gorizia, in the Puster Valley and in western Carinthia (which comprised the territory of contemporary East Tyrol) until the year 1500, when the family's last count (Leonhard of Gorizia) died without an heir. His remaining estates were inherited by the Austrian House of Habsburg.

History 
The dynasty probably hailed from the Rhenish Franconian Siegharding dynasty, which originally descended from the Kraichgau region and in the 10th century ruled in the Chiemgau of the German stem duchy of Bavaria. One Sieghardinger named Meginhard (or Meinhard, d. 1090) is documented as a count in the Bavarian gau of Pustertal. The progenitor of the Meinhardiner, Count Meinhard I of Gorizia, and his brother Engelbert, count palatine of Bavaria, may be his sons. The dynasty first appeared around Lienz and in the 11th century gained the office of a vogt at the town of Gorizia (Görz) in the Patriarchate of Aquileia.

Gorizia-Tyrol

Tyrol already in the early and later Middle Ages was an important mountain pass area with the lowest crossings over the Central Eastern Alps, vital for the Holy Roman Emperors to reach the Kingdom of Italy. The centres of the Imperial power were initially two Prince-bishoprics established by Emperor Conrad II in 1027, Brixen (Bressanone) and Trient (Trento). The bishops were the sovereigns of many semi-free compulsory henchmen (ministeriales) and local noblemen which styled until today the scenery with their numerous castles mostly south of the Brenner Pass. One of that noble families were the Counts of Tyrol, named after the Castle Tyrol near the town of Meran. They speedily ascended as bailiffs, who exercised the judicial power for the Trient and Brixen prince-bishops and finally took over the secular power in southern Bavaria after the deposition of the Welf duke Henry the Lion in 1180. One result of their becoming rulers of the area, was that the area is now called "Tyrol", after their ancestral castle.

Between 1253 and 1258 the Counts of Görz assumed the power in the Tyrolean lands, after the counts at Castle Tyrol had failed to produce a male heir. In 1237 Count Meinhard III had married Adelheid, daughter of Count Albert IV of Tyrol, who died in 1253 leaving no male heirs, and could in this way claim Tyrol as his inheritance. His son and successor Count Meinhard IV not only expanded the county, but also molded it into a more homogeneous country. He also created an administration, which, by the standards of his time, can only be called exemplary. Nevertheless, the three areas of country were too far apart to be ruled by a single count, and therefore it was decided to divide the county in 1267/71, when Meinhard IV ceded the County of Gorizia to his younger brother Albert I. Albert's descendants, the Gorizia line of the Meinhardiner dynasty, maintained their residence in Gorizia, until the line died out in 1500. The descendants of Meinhard IV, who was Count of Tyrol as Meinhard II, ruled Tyrol until 1363.

In 1286 Meinhard IV had also received the rule over the Duchy of Carinthia and the adjacent March of Carniola by the Habsburg king Rudolph I of Germany in turn for his support against King Ottokar II of Bohemia. Meinhard's son Henry in 1306 married Anne, the eldest daughter of King Wenceslaus II of Bohemia, and after the sudden death of his brother-in-law King Wenceslaus III in the same year even ascended the Bohemian throne. He however had to deal with claims raised by the Habsburg scion Rudolph III, son of King Albert I of Germany, and in the long run both could not prevail against Count John of Luxembourg, who became Bohemian king in 1310.

Decline
As Henry himself left no male heirs upon his death in 1335, the Austrian House of Habsburg inherited Carinthia and Carniola from the Gorizia-Tyrol branch.  The Habsburgs held these lands until 1918. Henry's only surviving daughter Margaret "Maultasch" and her husband John Henry of Luxembourg were able to retain the County of Tyrol. In 1363 she ceded the county to the Habsburg duke Rudolph IV of Austria after her only son with her second husband Duke Louis V of Bavaria, Count Meinhard III of Gorizia-Tyrol had died in the same year.

The Counts of Gorizia were moreover the Bailiffs of Aquileja. They are famous in numismatics as publishers of the first German golden coin, the "Zwainziger". The renowned diplomat and minnesinger Oswald von Wolkenstein was a subject of the Counts of Gorizia. The Gorizia branch of the dynasty became extinct in the year 1500, when the last male family member Count Leonhard of Gorizia died without issue. One apparent or illegitimate branch of the Meinhardiner was the Herren von Graben family, and their ancestry the Counts and Princes Orsini-Rosenberg. After Leonhards of Gorizia's death they became his successor as stadtholders of Lienz in East Tyrol. The Netherlands family of De Graeff claim descent from the Von Graben.

Counts 

Marquard (fl. 1060/1074), Vogt of Aquileia
Meginhard (died about 1090), from the House of Siegharding, Count in the Puster Valley
Henry I (died after 1102), Vogt of Aquileia from 1082
Ulrich (died 1122), brother
Meinhard I (died 1139/1142), descent uncertain, mentioned as Count of Gorizia in 1117, jointly with his brother
Engelbert I (died ), also count palatine of Bavaria and Vogt of Millstatt Abbey in Carinthia
Engelbert II (1142–1191), son of Meinhard I, jointly with his brother
Henry II (1142–1150)
Engelbert III (1191–1220), son of Engelbert II, jointly with his brother
Meinhard II the Elder (1191–1231)
Meinhard III (1231–1253), son of Engelbert III 
Inherited Tyrol in 1253

Gorizia-Tyrol 
Meinhard I (Meinhard III of Gorizia, 1253–1258)
Meinhard II (1258–1295), elder son of Meinhard I, Count of Tyrol after partition in 1271, also Duke of Carinthia from 1286 
Henry (1295–1335), son of Meinhard II, Count of Tyrol and Duke of Carinthia, King of Bohemia 1306 and 1307–1310
Otto (1295–1310), brother, Count of Tyrol and Duke of Carinthia 
Margaret, Countess of Tyrol (1335–1363), daughter of Henry
Line extinct, Tyrol fell to House of Habsburg

Gorizia 
Albert I (1258–1304), younger son of Meinhard I of Gorizia-Tyrol, ruled jointly with his brother Meinhard II until 1271 
Albert II (1304–1325), son of Albert I, jointly with his brother
Henry III (1304–1323) until 1307 partition, succeeded by
John Henry IV (1323–1338), son of Henry III
Meinhard VI (1338-1385), son of Albert II, Princely Count from 1365, and his brothers
Albert III (1338–1374)
Henry V (1338–1362)
Henry VI (1385–1454), son of Meinhard VI, jointly with his brother
John Meinhard VII (1385–1429)
Leonhard (1454–1500), son of Henry VI, jointly with his brothers
John II (1454–1462)
Louis (1454–after 1456)
Possessions to House of Habsburg, Gorizia part of Inner Austria from 1564 to 1619, Lienz unified with Tyrol

Other family members 
 Elisabeth of Gorizia-Tyrol (1262–1312), daughter of Meinhard IV, Queen-consort of the Romans in 1298 by marriage with King Albert I of Germany
 Elisabeth of Carinthia (1298 – after 1347), her niece, granddaughter of Meinhard IV by his son Otto, in 1337 queen-consort of Sicily as wife of King Peter II of Sicily
 Meinhard V (d. after 1318), son of Henry III

Family tree of Gorizia

References

 
Austrian noble families
Medieval royal families